Edward III of England has been depicted in a number of fictional works.

Literature
Edward III of England is the central character in the play Edward III, sometimes attributed to William Shakespeare. He also appears as a boy in Edward II by Christopher Marlowe. Edward is also the protagonist of William Blake's early drama Edward the Third, part of his Poetical Sketches, published in 1783.  George Bernard Shaw portrayed Edward for dramatic purposes as, in Shaw's preface to The Six of Calais, behaving himself like an unrestrained human being in a very trying situation. He also appears in Gaetano Donizetti's  opera L'assedio di Calais. Edward III appeared in George Alfred Lawrence's "sensation novel" about the Hundred Years' War, Brakespeare (1868). The novella "The Countess Alys"  (in The New Canterbury Tales (1901)) by Maurice Hewlett features Edward III as a character. Edward was also depicted in historical novels for younger readers, including  St. George For England (1885) by G. A. Henty. Edward is also featured in his role as English commander during the Battle of Crécy, in the novel Red Eve (1911) by Rider Haggard.

Edward appears in Maurice Druon's series of historical novels Les Rois maudits (The Accursed Kings). In the 1965 novel The King is a Witch by Evelyn Eaton, Edward is covertly a follower of a pagan "Old Religion".

Edward is a major character in The King's Mistress by Emma Campion and her Owen Archer mystery novel The Lady Chapel (1994) under the name Candace Robb. He appears in the 2000 Bernard Cornwell novel Harlequin, as well as in the 2007 Ken Follett novel World Without End, the sequel to Pillars of the Earth. Edward also appears briefly in The First Princess of Wales by Karen Harper.

Screen adaptations
Edward III has rarely been portrayed on screen. He was portrayed by Charles Kent in the 1911 silent short The Death of King Edward III and by Michael Hordern in the 1955 film The Dark Avenger, about Edward, the Black Prince. As a boy he has been portrayed by Stéphane Combesco in the 1982 French TV adaptation of Marlowe's play and by Jody Graber in Derek Jarman's 1991 version. In World Without End (2012), Blake Ritson portrayed Edward III.

Jean-Louis Broust portrayed Edward III in the 1972 French TV adaptation of Druon's Les Rois maudits novels, and Aurélien Wiik played the role in the 2005 French TV adaptation.

Edward is implied to be the son of Isabella and Scottish patriot William Wallace in the 1995 film Braveheart. This is historically impossible, as, at the time of Wallace's execution in 1305, Isabella was still only ten years old, and this was seven years before Edward was born. It is extremely unlikely that Wallace and Isabella ever met.

References 

Edward III
Edward III
Edward III of England